Tullymagough is a townland in County Tyrone, Northern Ireland. It is situated in the barony of Omagh East and the civil parish of Dromore and covers an area of 113 acres. 

The name derives from the Irish: Tulaigh Mhig Eochadha (Mac Geough's hillock).

In 1841 the population of the townland was 37 people (18 houses) and in 1851 it was 49 people (10 houses).

See also
List of townlands of County Tyrone

References

Townlands of County Tyrone